Eliraz is a surname. Notable people with the surname include:

Alexander Eliraz (1914–2004), Israeli sports shooter
Israel Eliraz (1936–2016), Israeli poet

Jewish surnames